Marymere Falls is located in Olympic National Park near Lake Crescent in Washington, United States. The falls are accessed by a one-mile, well-maintained, dirt trail through old-growth lowland forest consisting of fir, cedar, hemlock, and alder trees. Falls creek descends from Aurora Ridge and tumbles over Marymere Falls and then flows into Barnes Creek. The falls is one of the more popular attractions in the area, due to ease of access and proximity to U.S. Highway 101.

External links
 

Landforms of Clallam County, Washington
Waterfalls of Washington (state)
Landforms of Olympic National Park